You've Got to Walk It Like You Talk It or You'll Lose That Beat is a 1971 comedy-drama film directed by Peter Locke.

It involves a young hippie and his search for the meaning of life while in Central Park. Its soundtrack includes some of the earliest released music by Donald Fagen and Walter Becker, the duo who later formed the core of the group Steely Dan. The film also stars Richard Pryor in an early role playing his signature "wino" character, and actor/director Robert Downey Sr.

Future film director Wes Craven, then working at a New York City post-production company, made his professional feature debut as the film's editor.

Plot

Cast
Zalman King - Carter Fields
Suzette Green - Susan
Allen Garfield - Herby Moss
Richard Pryor - Wino
Robert Downey Sr. - Head of Ad Agency
Liz Torres - Singer in Men's Room
Roz Kelly - Girl in Park
Stan Gottlieb - Fallestrio
Daisy Locke - Old Woman
Billy Cunningham - Fat Lady

References

External links

Discogs entry

1971 films
1971 comedy-drama films
1970s English-language films
1971 comedy films
1971 drama films
Films set in New York City